Christopher Ellis (born April 14, 1956) is an American character actor.

Early life
Ellis was born in Dallas, Texas. He grew up in Frayser, a suburb of Memphis, in a middle class/working class area. He always wanted to be an actor because of what he saw on television.

It took him seven years to finish college however, because "I have always been shiftless". During those years Chris became involved in community theatre in Memphis, Tennessee, where "I did and do still think the quality of the work has always been quite good". By the time he moved to New York, he had worked with many excellent actors in about two dozen plays, classical and contemporary. "I cannot imagine what might have supplanted that background for a newcomer in New York."

Career 
His first part in either television or film came in 1979, where he played a truck driver in the television movie The Suicide's Wife, which starred Angie Dickinson. The role resulted in little further work. After working in regional theater for a year or so, Ellis did not work for about ten years. During that time he lived in "bone-grinding poverty" in Manhattan's Hell's Kitchen. In one nine-month period of 1987, Ellis accepted 102 dinner invitations. "I don't know why they kept arriving, nor why I counted them, though I do know why I accepted them."

In 1990, a break came when he got a part in Days of Thunder. This seemed to jump-start Ellis's career as parts in My Cousin Vinny, Addams Family Values and Apollo 13 as former NASA Mercury Seven astronaut Deke Slayton. He began picking up credits on well-known television series including Melrose Place, NYPD Blue and The X-Files.

After working with Hanks on Apollo 13, the two worked together on That Thing You Do, the television miniseries From the Earth to the Moon and Catch Me If You Can. Ellis played fictional NASA Mission Control when he played a flight director in 1998's Armageddon.

Additional Ellis appearances include Bean: The Movie, Home Fries, Jessabelle, Gospel Hill, October Sky, Live Free or Die Hard, Tim Burton's Planet of the Apes and Transformers. His television credits also include The West Wing, Ghost Whisperer, Chicago Hope, The Pretender, Alias, JAG, CSI: NY, Burn Notice, Cold Case, Veronica Mars and Political Animals.

He appeared in three season one episodes of Millennium as group member Jim Panseayres. He established a reputation for portraying Southern lawmakers or serious military or police-type characters. He played a priest in The Dark Knight Rises (2012).

He appeared in Criminal Minds as Sheriff Jimmy Rhodes. He had two guest appearances in NCIS as Gunnery Sergeant John Deluca. Ellis's appearance in the season 1 episode "The Curse" was uncredited while his second and final appearance in the season 2 episode "The Bone Yard" was credited.

Filmography

Film

Television

References

External links
 

1956 births
American male film actors
American male stage actors
American male television actors
Living people
Male actors from Memphis, Tennessee
Male actors from Dallas
20th-century American male actors
21st-century American male actors